Harpagidia magnetella is a moth in the family Gelechiidae. It was described by Staudinger in 1871. It is found in Asia Minor, Palestine, Lebanon, Armenia, Greece and Russia.

The wingspan is about 19 mm.

References

Moths described in 1871
Dichomeridinae